Abrostola is a genus of moths of the family Noctuidae.

Species

 Abrostola abrostolina Butler, 1879
 Abrostola agnorista Dufay, 1956
 Abrostola anophioides Moore, 1882
 Abrostola asclepiadis Denis & Schiffermüller, 1775
 Abrostola bettoni Dufay, 1958
 Abrostola brevipennis Dufay, 1958
 Abrostola canariensis Hampson, 1913
 Abrostola clarissa Staudinger, 1900
 Abrostola confusa Dufay, 1958
 Abrostola congolensis Dufay, 1958
 Abrostola dejeani Dufay, 1958
 Abrostola fallax Dufay, 1975
 Abrostola gabori Ronkay, 1987
 Abrostola hyrcanica Hacker & Ebert, 2002
 Abrostola imitatrix Dufay, 1975
 Abrostola karsholti Ronkay & Thöny, 1997
 Abrostola kaszabi Dufay, 1971
 Abrostola korbi Dufay, 1958
 Abrostola major Dufay, 1958
 Abrostola marmorea Dufay, 1958
 Abrostola microvalis Ottolengui, 1919 – Minute Oval Abrostola Moth
 Abrostola obliqua Dufay, 1958
 Abrostola obscura Dufay, 1958
 Abrostola oculea Dufay, 1958
 Abrostola ovalis Guenée, 1852 – Oval Abrostola Moth
 Abrostola pacifica Dufay, 1960
 Abrostola parvula Barnes & McDunnough, 1916
 Abrostola peruviana Ronkay & Thöny, 1997
 Abrostola proxima Dufay, 1958
 Abrostola pulverea Dufay, 1958
 Abrostola rougeoti Dufay, 1977
 Abrostola schintlmeisteri Behounek & Ronkay, 1999
 Abrostola sugii Dufay, 1960
 Abrostola suisharyonis Strand, 1920
 Abrostola triopis Hampson, 1902
 Abrostola tripartita Hufnagel, 1766 – The Spectacle
 Abrostola triplasia Linnaeus, 1758 – Dark Spectacle
 Abrostola ugartii Ronkay & Thöny, 1997
 Abrostola urentis Guenée, 1852 – Spectacled Nettle Moth
 Abrostola ussuriensis Dufay, 1958
 Abrostola violacea Dufay, 1958

References

Plusiinae
Noctuoidea genera
Taxa named by Ferdinand Ochsenheimer